Polyspilota aeruginosa, common name Madagascan marbled mantis, is a species of praying mantis native to Africa. Adult females reach  in length while males are smaller around 6 to 7 cm.

See also
List of mantis genera and species

References

Mantidae
Mantodea of Africa
Insects described in 1778
Taxa named by Johann August Ephraim Goeze